Frederick Sheldon Mwesigwa (or Fred; called Sheldon)  is an Anglican bishop in Uganda: he is the current Bishop of Ankole .

References

21st-century Anglican bishops in Uganda
Anglican bishops of Ankole
Uganda Christian University alumni
Year of birth missing (living people)
Living people